Philip Howard Vance (born 23 November 1962) is a British former motorcycle speedway rider.

Born in Cardiff, Vance was signed by King's Lynn Stars in the late 1970s, riding in their successful Anglia Junior League team but never for their senior team, although he made a few appearances in the National League for Boston Barracudas and Scunthorpe Stags. In 1980 he transferred to Leicester Lions, riding in the junior team and made one appearance for the club in the British League, failing to score. He spent most of the season on loan to Exeter Falcons in the National League. In 1981 he rode in five matches for Rye House Rockets but only score eleven points in total in what proved to be his final season apart from two guest appearances for Wimbledon Dons in 1984 and 1987.

References

1962 births
Living people
British speedway riders
Welsh speedway riders
Welsh motorcycle racers
Sportspeople from Cardiff
Leicester Lions riders
Exeter Falcons riders
Rye House Rockets riders
Boston Barracudas riders
Scunthorpe Scorpions riders